The AMD 700 chipset series (also called as AMD 7-Series Chipsets) is a set of chipsets designed by ATI for AMD Phenom processors to be sold under the AMD brand. Several members were launched in the end of 2007 and the first half of 2008, others launched throughout the rest of 2008.

Development history
The existence of the chipsets was proven in October 2006 through two hardware websites in Chile and Spain which posted the leaked slides of an ATI internal event, "ATI chipset update". In the slides, ATI has shown a series of RD700 series chipset logics codenamed RD790, RX790, RS780 and RS740 respectively. A SB700 southbridge was also mentioned in the event. The 790X (codename RD780) chipset was spotted in Computex 2007, exhibited by ASUS. The RS780D was first reported by HKEPC while the RX780H was first seen on ECS internal presentations.

After the acquisition of ATI Technologies, AMD started to participate in the development of the chipset series. And as a result, the first performance and enthusiast segment chipsets products under the AMD brand, the 790FX, 790X and 770 chipsets were launched on November 19, 2007 as part of the Spider codenamed desktop performance platform. The 780 chipset series, first launched in China on January 23, 2008, and released worldwide on March 5, 2008 during CeBIT 2008, mobile chipsets (M740G, M780G and M780T chipsets) were released on June 4, 2008 during Computex 2008 as part of the Puma mobile platform and the 790GX chipset was released on August 6, 2008, while some other members released at a later date in 2008. The 785G was announced on August 4, 2009.

Line-up

790FX

Codenamed RD790, final name revealed to be "AMD 790FX chipset"
single AMD processor configuration
Four physical PCIe 2.0 x16 slots @ x8 or two physical PCIe 2.0 x16 slots, one PCIe 2.0 x4 slot and two PCIe 2.0 x1 slots, the chipset provides a total of 38 PCIe 2.0 lanes and 4 PCIe 1.1 for A-Link Express II solely in the Northbridge
HyperTransport 3.0 with support for HTX slots and PCI Express 2.0
ATI CrossFire X
AutoXpress
AMD OverDrive
Energy efficient Northbridge design
65 nm CMOS fabrication process manufactured by TSMC
Extreme overclocking, reported to have achieved about 420 MHz bus for overclocking an Athlon 64 FX-62 processor, from originally 200 MHz.
Optional discrete chipset cache memory of at least 16 KB to reduce latencies and increase bandwidth
Supports Dual Gigabit Ethernet, and teaming option
Reference board codenamed "Wahoo" for dual-processor system reference design board with three physical PCI-E x16 slots, and "HammerHead" for single-socket system reference design board with four physical PCI-E x16 slots, also notable was the reference boards includes two ATA ports and only four SATA 3.0 Gbit/s ports (as being paired with SB600 southbridge).
Will pair with SB750 southbridge with support up to six SATA ports and enhanced Phenom processors overclocking via ACC functionality, and will later support Socket AM3 with DDR3 SDRAM support in the first quarter of 2009.
Enthusiast discrete multi-graphics segment
Public documentation is not available yet

790X
Codenamed RD780, final name revealed to be "AMD 790X chipset"
Single AMD processor configuration
One physical PCIe 2.0 x16 slot or two physical PCIe 2.0 x16 slots @ x8, one PCIe 2.0 x4 slot and two PCIe 2.0 x1 slots, the chipset provides a total of 22 PCIe 2.0 lanes and 4 PCIe 1.1 for A-Link Express II solely in the Northbridge
HyperTransport 3.0 and PCI Express 2.0
ATI CrossFire
AutoXpress
AMD OverDrive
Energy efficient Northbridge design
65 nm CMOS fabrication process manufactured by TSMC
Mobile version (codenamed RD780M) planned, supporting CrossFire for two AXIOM/MXM discrete mobile GPUs
Can pair with SB750 southbridge with support up to six SATA ports and enhanced Phenom processors overclocking via ACC functionality.
Supports Socket AM3 with DDR3 SDRAM depending on motherboard BIOS
Performance discrete multi-graphics segment

790GX

Codenamed RS780D, final name seen on internal AMD presentation
Single AMD processor configuration
One physical PCIe 2.0 x16 slot or two physical PCIe 2.0 x16 slots @ x8, one PCIe 2.0 x4 slot and two PCIe 2.0 x1 slots, the chipset provides a total of 22 PCIe 2.0 lanes and 4 PCIe 1.1 for A-Link Express II solely in the Northbridge
Integrated graphics: Radeon HD 3300
ATI Hybrid Graphics
Side-port memory as local frame buffer, supporting DDR2 and GDDR3 chips.
ATI PowerPlay technology
UVD+
Two physical PCI-E x16 slots (one 16x and one 8x electrically. In Crossfire mode, both will revert to 8x electrically)
HyperTransport 3.0 and PCI Express 2.0
ATI CrossFire
Hybrid CrossFire X
AMD OverDrive
Energy efficient Northbridge design
55 nm CMOS fabrication process manufactured by TSMC
528-pin Flip Chip Ball Grid Array (FCBGA) package
Performance hybrid multi-graphics segment

785G
Codenamed RS880
Single AMD processor configuration
One physical PCIe 2.0 x16 slot, one PCIe 2.0 x4 slot and two PCIe 2.0 x1 slots, the chipset provides a total of 22 PCIe 2.0 lanes and 4 PCIe 1.1 for A-Link Express II solely in the Northbridge
Integrated graphics: Radeon HD 4200
ATI Hybrid Graphics and PowerXpress
Side-port memory as local frame buffer, supporting DDR2 and DDR3
UVD 2.0
ATI Stream capabilities
No 7.1-channel LPCM support
HyperTransport 3.0 and PCI Express 2.0
AMD OverDrive
Energy efficient Northbridge design
55 nm CMOS fabrication process by TSMC
Mainstream hybrid graphics (DirectX 10.1 IGP) segment

785E
Codenamed RS785E
Single AMD processor configuration
One physical PCIe 2.0 x16 slot or two physical PCIe 2.0 x16 slots @ x8, one PCIe 2.0 x4 slot and two PCIe 2.0 x1 slots, the chipset provides a total of 22 PCIe 2.0 lanes and 4 PCIe 1.1 for A-Link Express II solely in the Northbridge
Integrated graphics: Radeon HD 4200
ATI Hybrid Graphics and PowerXpress
Side-port memory as local frame buffer, supporting DDR2 and  GDDR3
ATI PowerPlay technology
UVD 2
HyperTransport 3.0 and PCI Express 2.0
ATI CrossFire
Hybrid CrossFire X
High-end embedded systems segment

780G/780V
Codenamed RS780/RS780C
Single AMD processor configuration
One physical PCIe 2.0 x16 slot, one PCIe 2.0 x4 slot and two PCIe 2.0 x1 slots, the chipset provides a total of 22 PCIe 2.0 lanes and 4 PCIe 1.1 for A-Link Express II solely in the Northbridge
Integrated graphics: Radeon HD 3200 (780G), Radeon 3100 (780V)
205 million transistors
ATI Hybrid Graphics and PowerXpress (780G only, PowerXpress for M780G only)
Side-port memory as local frame buffer, supporting DDR2 and GDDR3 chips (780G only)
ATI PowerPlay technology
UVD+ (780G only)
One physical PCI-E x16 slot
 HyperTransport 3.0 and PCI Express 2.0
AMD OverDrive
Energy efficient Northbridge design
55 nm CMOS fabrication process manufactured by TSMC
528-pin Flip Chip Ball Grid Array (FCBGA) package
1.1 V core voltage
"Remote IT" (temporary name, 780V only)
Pin-to-Pin compatible to RS690
Reference board design codenamed "Seahorse"
Mobile version (M780G, codenamed RS780M/M780V, codenamed RS780MC) demonstrated in May 2007, and will be available during second or third quarter (Q2-Q3) 2008, with the implementation of PowerXpress technology, providing one PCI-E slot for AXIOM/MXM modules and HyperFlash support for the Puma platform
Mainstream hybrid graphics (DirectX 10 IGP) segment (780G), value and commercial DirectX 10 IGP segment (780V)

780E
Codenamed RS780E
Single AMD processor configuration
One physical PCIe 2.0 x16 slot or two physical PCIe 2.0 x16 slots @ x8, one PCIe 2.0 x4 slot and two PCIe 2.0 x1 slots, the chipset provides a total of 22 PCIe 2.0 lanes and 4 PCIe 1.1 for A-Link Express II solely in the Northbridge
Integrated graphics: Radeon HD 3200
205 million transistors
ATI Hybrid Graphics and PowerXpress
Side-port memory as local frame buffer, supporting DDR2 and GDDR3 chips up to 128 MB
ATI PowerPlay technology
UVD+
One x16 or two x8 PCI-E x16 slot (physical x16 slot)
HyperTransport 3.0 and PCI Express 2.0
ATI CrossFire
Hybrid CrossFire X
Energy efficient Northbridge design
55 nm CMOS fabrication process manufactured by TSMC
528-pin Flip Chip Ball Grid Array (FCBGA) package
1.1 V core voltage
Reference development board design codenamed "Mahogany"
High-end embedded systems segment

770
Codenamed RX780, final product name revealed by ECS
Single AMD processor configuration
One physical PCIe 2.0 x16 slot, one PCIe 2.0 x4 slot and two PCIe 2.0 x1 slots, the chipset provides a total of 22 PCIe 2.0 lanes and 4 PCIe 1.1 for A-Link Express II solely in the Northbridge
HyperTransport 3.0 and PCI Express 2.0
AMD OverDrive
Energy efficient Northbridge design
65 nm CMOS fabrication process manufactured by TSMC
Mobile version (M770, codenamed RX781), supports discrete graphics, and support for "add-on" graphics solution, via external PCI-E cabling
Mainstream discrete single-graphics segment
Public documentation is not available yet

760G
Codenamed RS780L
Single AMD processor configuration
One physical PCIe 2.0 x16 slot and one PCIe 2.0 x4 slot, the chipset provides a total of 20 PCIe 2.0 lanes and 4 PCIe 1.1 for A-Link Express II solely in the Northbridge
Integrated graphics: Radeon 3000 Graphics
GPU 350 MHz, memory shared DDR3 533 MHz, power consumption 5.1-6.1 W
ATI PowerPlay technology
ATI Hybrid Graphics
55 nm CMOS fabrication process manufactured by TSMC
HyperTransport 3.0 and PCI Express 2.0
Value DirectX 10.0 IGP segment
Public documentation is not available yet

740
Codenamed RX740
Single AMD processor configuration
One physical PCIe 1.1 x16 slot and one PCIe 1.1 x4 slot, the chipset provides a total of 20 PCIe 1.1 lanes and 4 PCIe 1.1 for A-Link Express II solely in the Northbridge
HyperTransport 2.0 and PCI Express 1.1a
Energy efficient Northbridge design
Value discrete single-graphics segment
Public documentation is not available yet

Southbridges
Besides the use of SB600 southbridge for earlier releases of several members in late 2007, all of the above chipsets can also utilize newer southbridge designs, the SB700, SB710 and the SB750 southbridges. Future server chipsets will also utilize the server version (SB700S/SB750S) of the southbridges. Features provided by the southbridge are listed as follows:

SB700
Support up to 6 SATA 3.0 Gbit/s hard disk drives, with RAID 0, 1, 10 support
eSATA support
1 x IDE connector supporting ATA-133/100/66/33 and up to 2 IDE devices
Support up to 14 USB ports (12 USB 2.0 and 2 USB 1.1)
I/O acceleration technologies
Consumer Infrared receiver/transmitter port compatible with IrDA standards
DASH 1.0 support

SB710
All features from SB700
Super I/O
Advanced Clock Calibration for enhanced CPU overclocking
Direct communication channel composed of six data pins which were previously reserved between the CPU and the southbridge
Advanced Clock Calibration (Option available with AMD OverDrive software 2.1.1 and later)

SB750
All features of SB700
RAID 5 support
Super I/O
Enhanced CPU overclocking for K10-based processors only, originally named "OverDrive 3.0"
Direct communication channel composed of six data pins which were previously reserved between the CPU and the southbridge
Advanced Clock Calibration (Option available with AMD OverDrive software 2.1.1 and later)

SP5100
All features of SB700
Super I/O
Target for future server chipsets
Originally named SB700S, later renamed as SP5100.

SB750S
All features of SB750
Target for future server chipsets

Key features

Multi-graphics

The ATI CrossFire X technology supports multiple video cards to be connected to enhance the visual display and 3D rendering capabilities of the system, using AFR mode and/or scissor mode. Alternatively, systems with multiple video card CrossFire X setup will support multiple display monitors up to eight.

For the AMD 790FX chipset, the CrossFire X technology allows up to 4 video cards to be connected, made possible as the chipset supports four physical PCI-E x16 slots. The PCI-E lanes can be configured for 4 slots at x8 bandwidth or 2 slots at x16 bandwidth (16x-16x, 8x-8x-8x or 8x-8x-8x-8x CrossFire X setup). Reports indicate 2.6 times the performance with triple-card CrossFire than that of a single card, and more than 3.3 times the performance increase for quad-card CrossFire. Gigabyte have revealed in a leaked product presentation that the four card CrossFire X setup does not require CrossFire connectors; the data will be exchanged among the PCI-E slots which is monitored and controlled by Catalyst drivers.

For the performance segment, CrossFire on the AMD 790X chipset has two physical PCI-E x16 slots with one operating at x8 bandwidth (dual-card 8x-8x CrossFire), supporting up to four display monitors.

Multi-graphics is also supported for the 790GX IGP chipset, named as Hybrid CrossFire X.

AMD OverDrive

Another feature is AMD OverDrive, an application designed to boost system performance through a list of items in real-time, without a system reboot, as listed below:

Real-time Overclocking:
Novice mode for users not familiar with system tuning, includes a slider of level 0 to 10 for easy system tuning
Advanced mode for more familiar enthusiasts to fine tune various system parameters including: Clock frequencies – independent clock frequencies for independent processor cores (Phenom processors only), PCI-E lanes, system bus frequency; Multipliers for each of the CPU cores and HyperTransport links (downward direction only except Black Edition processors); And voltages for CPU (VID and VDDC), CPU HyperTransport, DDR2 Memory (VDDQ and VTT), northbridge core (VCore) and Northbridge PCI-E. Overclocking also applies to the IGP and the side-port memory since the release of version 2.1.4.
"Auto Clock" for automatic fine-tuning and overclocking
Memory fine-tuning – DDR2 Memory parameters
System monitoring:
System information
Simple mode – Windows Task Manager like CPU cores usage histogram, with CPU core clock Frequencies, CPU Multipliers, CPU core voltages (VCore), CPU Temperature; GPU details including GPU core frequency, video memory frequency; and system parameters including system bus frequency, southbridge frequency, PCI-E lanes frequency and memory frequency
Detailed mode – include all system information items presented in the simple mode, with the addition of CPU caches, CPU voltages, memory details including memory frequencies and SPD settings, HyperTransport frequency and link width
System Monitor
(Optional) System benchmark, resulting a value to reflect relative system performance, tests include: integer computation, floating-point computation, memory speed, cache speed
(Optional) Processor stability test, normally runs for one hour, can also be run for a minimum of 1 minute or a maximum of seven days, to identify whether the system becomes unstable for use after fine-tuning under full-loading condition. Tests include: integer (integer units) calculations and stack operations test for each processor core, floating-point (128-bit FPU) calculations test for each processor core, calculation test (Phenom processors only), MCA registers checking test
Maintenance/User-friendly functionalities:
Profile(s) saving and loading capabilities
Log records output

The application will support all members of the AMD 700 chipset series, including the 740 series chipsets which are aimed at value markets, and AMD processors including Phenom and Athlon 64 family of processors, but due to architectural limitations, independent clock frequency settings for different processor cores (a feature implemented in the K10 microarchitecture) will not function on Athlon 64 family of processors (except for Athlon X2 7000 series which is based on K10).

AutoXpress
The AutoXpress technology is a set of automatic system tuning features to enhance system performance, which were revealed by members of ChileHardware when investigating the BIOS for AMD 790FX, 790X and 770 chipsets. AutoXpress will be available on AMD 790FX (codenamed RD790) chipset, with AMD 790X (codenamed RD780) and AMD 770 (codenamed RX780) chipsets implementing a subset of all the features. The AutoXpress technology is similar to the LinkBoost capability presented on NVIDIA nForce 500/600 chipsets.

The feature must be enabled via BIOS, options appeared in the BIOS includes ON/OFF/Custom, which choosing the "Custom" option will open up three further options, namely "CPU", "XpressRoute" and "MemBoost" with ON/OFF options, and ON as default. Details about the AutoXpress features are listed as follows:

Advanced Clock Calibration
Advanced clock calibration (ACC) is a feature originally available for Phenom families of processors, particularly for Black Edition ones, to increase the overclocking potential of the CPU. ACC is supported by the SB710 and the SB750 southbridges, and available through BIOS settings on some motherboards and AMD OverDrive utility.

It was later discovered that this functionality has the possibility of unlocking the supposedly disabled cores of some Phenom II X2/X3 processors. In normal cases, it is not possible to use or unlock any of those hidden cores because originally those cores were disabled: a technique called "chip harvesting" or "feature binning" used by AMD to sell parts with one or two defective cores which will cause system instability if not disabled.

The following are available through the Advanced Clock Calibration feature:
 Auto or manual settings
 Allow separate settings for each of the CPU cores
 Allowed range: -12% to +12%
 Possibility of unlocking AMD Phenom II X2/X3, AMD Athlon II X2/X3 and AMD Sempron locked cores / cache. (with BIOS support)

The principle of ACC is not publicly discussed by AMD but some third-party vendors, including ASUS (Core Unlocker) and Biostar (BIO-unlocKING) have had it for some time. Gigabyte has added this feature, called CPU Core Control, to many NB785/SB710 boards via BIOS update, and will be including this feature (now called Auto Unlock) in all of their 800 Series boards with the SB850 chip. On many of the boards, the feature is dependent on BIOS version. While NVIDIA also has a similar technology for its nForce 780a motherboards, called NVCC (NVIDIA Clock Calibration) with very similar functionality.

Energy efficiency
One of the major focus of the chipset series is the energy efficiency of the chipsets. The need for energy-efficient chipsets have risen since chipsets starts including more features and more PCI Express lanes, to provide better system scalability by using PCI-E add-on cards.

But one issue is that chipset circuitries were usually made on a larger fabrication process nodes compared with the latest CPU process node, making recent chipsets consume more and more power than their predecessors. Recent examples including the Intel X38 chipset Northbridge (MCH), labelling 26.5 W TDP with a maximum idle power of 12.3 W, which results in the usage of integrated heat spreader (IHS) design over the chip to help heat spread evenly, with ASUS even adding water cooling block directly on top of the heatsink of the X38 Northbridge as a part of the motherboard heatpipe system. Although the aforementioned figures may be small compared to the TDP figures of a performance CPU, there is a growing demand for computer systems with higher performance and lower power consumption. While Intel focuses only on the energy efficiency of its processors, NVIDIA's nForce 780i chipset requires an overall power consumption of 48 W with the northbridge, southbridge and the nForce 200 PCI-E bridge.

In response to this, all discrete northbridges of the chipset series were designed on a 65 nm CMOS process, manufactured by TSMC, aimed at lowering power consumptions of chipsets. According to internal testing and various reports, the Northbridge of the AMD 790FX chipset (RD790) runs at 3 W when idle, and maximum 10 W under load, nominal 8 W power consumption, the northbridge was seen on reference design of the AMD 790FX chipset with single passive cooling heatsink instead of connecting to heat pipes which are frequently used on current performance motherboard offers, the chipset on the whole (the combination of RD790 Northbridge and SB600 Southbridge) consumes nominally less than 15 W.

The integrated graphics northbridges were also benefited, as most of the IGP northbridges were made on 55 nm process manufactured by TSMC with the inclusion of ATI PowerPlay technology, allowing dynamically changing the core clock frequency to minimum 150 MHz. The 780G Northbridge, sporting DirectX 10 support, consumes only 11.4 W on full load, 0.94 watt when idle. This is also smaller than the TDP figures of the Intel G35 chipset Northbridge at 28 W with the maximum idle power of 11 W.

ATI Hybrid Graphics

The ATI Hybrid Graphics technology applies to all or some of the integrated graphics chipsets of this chipset series, technologies including Hybrid CrossFire X, SurroundView and PowerXpress. Reports confirmed that the 790GX IGP (codenamed RS780D) chipset will be able to handle dual video card and IGP as a CrossFire X setup.  Hybrid Graphics are only available with 24xx, 34xx, & 42xx model ATI graphics cards.

I/O acceleration technologies
All chipsets paired with either SB700, SB710 or SB750 southbridge will support two I/O acceleration technologies, as listed below:

Hybrid Drives
The southbridges also support hybrid drives via SATA or supported ATA ports, which is compliant with the requirements of the Windows ReadyDrive technology, which is basically a conventional hard drive with an embedded NAND flash module.

HyperFlash
The HyperFlash, basically a NAND flash module on a card, originally planned as a device connected to the supported IDE/ATA 66/100/133 channel, to speed up system performance through the Windows ReadyBoost and Windows ReadyDrive functionality.

A HyperFlash module consists of two parts, the first part is a HyperFlash memory card which are flash memory chips on a small PCB (dimensions similar to a Canadian quarter 25¢, with diameter 23.88 mm, but rectangular in shape) with contacts similar to SO-DIMM modules. The other part is a flash controller on an ATA connector, with similar latches/socket ejectors as SO-DIMM sockets. The HyperFlash memory card is inserted into the flash controller and then directly plugged into the motherboard ATA connector. The memory chips used on the HyperFlash memory card will be Samsung's OneNAND flash memory modules with maximum four-die configuration (four-die in a single package), running at 83 MHz frequency, providing a bandwidth of 108 MB/s on a 16-bit bus width. Since the flash controller is designed to be compatible with ATA pin-out definitions (also to fit the ATA motherboard connector) and is designed by Molex, this allows OEMs to produce their own brands of HyperFlash modules while at the same time providing maximum compatibility between HyperFlash modules.

Three variants were reportedly be available for HyperFlash modules, with capacity of 512 MiB, 1 GiB and 2 GiB respectively, with expected DVT samples in November 2007 and mass-production expected in December 2007 (supported by Beta motherboard drivers) and official motherboard driver support planned in February 2008. However, it was reportedly cancelled.

RAIDXpert
The RAIDXpert is a remote RAID configuration tool, for changing the RAID level of the RAID setup connected via SATA 3.0 Gbit/s ports (connected to SB600, excluding extra SATA 3.0 Gbit/s ports through additional SATA chip on some motherboard implementations), including RAID 0, RAID 1, and RAID 0+1.

Integrated graphics
Some of the members of the AMD 700 chipset series, specifically the 780 and 740 family of chipsets and the 790GX chipset, have integrated graphics onboard (IGP), as well as supporting hardware video playback acceleration at different levels. All IGP northbridges are pin-compatible to each other and even predecessors (690 series), to lower the product cost for each PCB redesign due to pin incompatibility and maximize the product lineup. These IGP features are listed below:

"Remote IT"
For the enterprise platform, the "Remote IT" technology (temporary name) was reported to be released by the end of 2007 or early 2008. The platform composed of an AMD 780V chipset with an SB700 southbridge, and chips from Broadcom, Realtek and Marvell. It was reported to have incorporated the Broadcom BCM5761 managed NIC controller with Intelligent Platform Management Interface (IPMI) 1.5 manageability standard, together with DASH 1.0 specification (DASH page on DMTF) support of the SB700 and SB750 southbridges, and reported support additional management and security technologies such as IDM (Intelligent Device Management) and TPM 1.2 (Trusted Platform Module).

Reception
In a comparison against the GeForce 8200, Anandtech considered the 780G "a better balanced chipset offering improved casual gaming performance, equal video quality, similar power requirements, greater availability, and better pricing." The 8200, however, was preferred as a single-purpose HTPC solution. Both chipsets were considered superior to Intel's G45/X4500HD, which was cited for a lack of driver quality and features, and a higher price.

Northbridge issues (760G, M770, 780x, M780x, 790GX)
All platforms:
Low speed instability with HyperTransport version 3 capable processors. HT3 speeds 1.2 GHz up to 1.6 GHz should not be used, only 1.8 up to 2.2 GHz speeds are safe to be used. HT3 processors operating at 1.6 GHz (Phenom X3 8250e, Phenom X4 9100e and Phenom X4 9150e) will suffer from high retry count on the HyperTransport link which may result in hangs on revision A12 northbridges.
Windows platform:
 Microsoft KB959345

Southbridge issues (SB7x0)
Most OSes require patches in order to work reliably.
Windows platform:
Microsoft KB982091
Microsoft KB956871
Microsoft KB953689
Linux platform:
 HPET operation with MSI causes LPC DMA corruption on devices using LPC DMA (floppy, parallel port, serial port in FIR mode) because MSI requests are misinterpreted as DMA cycles by the broken LPC controller
USB freeze when multiple devices are connected through hub (related to AMD Product Advisory PA_SB700AK1)
Erratic behaviour of the HPET when Spread Spectrum is enabled (related to AMD Product Advisory PA_SB700AG2)
Disabling legacy interrupts for SATA disables MSI too
SATA soft reset fails when PMP is enabled and attached devices will not be detected
SATA internal errors are ignored because the controller will set Serial ATA port Error when it should not

See also
AMD 800 chipset series
AMD 900 chipset series
nForce 700
Advanced Micro Devices
ATI Technologies
Comparison of AMD chipsets
Comparison of AMD graphics processing units

References

External links
AMD official website
ATI official website
AMD 7-Series Chipsets product information
AMD 7-Series Chipsets with integrated graphics
AMD 780E|SB710 Chipset: A high-performance embedded platform solution
AMD 785E Designed to deliver a superior visual experience in an ultra power-efficient platform

AMD chipsets
ATI Technologies products
Computer-related introductions in 2008